Farmacias Benavides S.A. de C.V. is a Mexican drugstore chain.

It was founded in 1917 in Monterrey, Mexico, and is owned along with the Chilean pharmacy company Farmacias Ahumada by Walgreens Boots Alliance. Farmacias Benavides has since returned to financial health, and is now opening new locations throughout the region.

It began operations as Botica del Carmen in Monterrey, and opened its first drugstores in 1940 in this same city. It grew over the next 60 years to have over 1300 drugstores throughout northern and western Mexico.

Gallery

External links

 

Retail companies established in 1917
Pharmacies of Mexico
Companies based in Monterrey
Mexican brands
Mexican companies established in 1917
Walgreens Boots Alliance